Captain Dayton P. Clarke (December 15, 1840 to November 10, 1915) was an American soldier who fought in the American Civil War. Clarke received the country's highest award for bravery during combat, the Medal of Honor, for his action during the Battle of Spotsylvania Court House in Virginia on 12 May 1864. He was honored with the award on 30 June 1892.

Biography
Dayton Perry Clarke (sometimes spelled Clark) was born in Hermon, New York on 15 December 1840. He enlisted into the 2nd Vermont. He died on 10 November 1915 and his remains are interred at Green Mount Cemetery in Montpelier.

Medal of Honor citation

See also

List of American Civil War Medal of Honor recipients: A–F

References

1840 births
1915 deaths
People of New York (state) in the American Civil War
People of Vermont in the American Civil War
Union Army officers
United States Army Medal of Honor recipients
American Civil War recipients of the Medal of Honor
Burials at Green Mount Cemetery (Montpelier, Vermont)